Louka Daniel Prip Andreasen (born 29 June 1997) is a Danish professional footballer who plays as a winger for AaB.

Career

Hvidovre IF
On 3 June 2015, Prip made his debut for Hvidovre IF against Avedøre IF at the age of 17. Prip played more and more for the first team, and was permanently promoted to the first time squad in the summer 2016. He was on a trial at Danish Superliga club, AaB in November 2017, but a move never materialised.

AC Horsens
On 14 January 2019, AC Horsens announced the signing of Prip from Hvidovre IF on a contract until 31 December 2022 Prip made his debut for Horsens on 10 February 2019 in a match against Hobro IK, replacing Thomas Kortegaard in the 57th minute.

References

External links

1997 births
Living people
People from Hvidovre Municipality
Sportspeople from the Capital Region of Denmark
Danish men's footballers
Association football wingers
Danish Superliga players
Danish 1st Division players
Danish 2nd Division players
BK Avarta players
Brøndby IF players
Hvidovre IF players
AC Horsens players
AaB Fodbold players